= Reton Lake =

Lake in the state of Wisconsin, United States

- Location within Wisconsin Location within the United States
- Location: Portage County, Wisconsin
- Coordinates: 44°31′43″N 89°18′06″W
- Type: lake
- Etymology: J. O. Reton, an early settler
- Basin countries: United States
- Surface elevation: 1,093 ft (333 m)

Reton Lake is a lake in the U.S. state of Wisconsin.

Reton Lake was named after J. O. Reton, an early settler.
